Rajshri Productions Pvt. Ltd. is a film production and distribution company based in Mumbai, India, established in 1947, which is primarily involved in producing Hindi films. The most successful films produced by the company include Dosti (1964), Ankhiyon Ke Jharokhon Se (1978), Nadiya Ke Paar (1982), Saaransh (1984), Maine Pyar Kiya (1989) Hum Aapke Hain Kaun (1994), Hum Saath Saath Hain (1999), Vivah (2006) and Prem Ratan Dhan Payo (2015). It has produced successful shows like Woh Rehne Waali Mehlon Ki, Yahan Main Ghar Ghar Kheli, and Pyaar Ka Dard Hai Meetha Meetha Pyaara Pyaara.

History
Rajshri Productions, the film production division of Rajshri, was established in 1947. Its first release Aarti met with critical acclaim and was screened at international film festivals. This was followed by Dosti, a non-star-cast film which became a box office success, and received the National Award for the Best Hindi Film of the Year (1964) and six Filmfare Awards.

Rajshri Productions made several more successful and critically acclaimed movies between the 1960s and 1980s including Uphaar, Geet Gaata Chal, Ankhiyon Ke Jharokhon Se, Chitchor, Dulhan Wahi Jo Piya Man Bhaye and Saaransh. At the end of the 1980s, when the film industry experienced a slump due to the advent of home video, Rajshri was on the verge of closing down. However, the company had a hit with a musical teenage romance, Maine Pyar Kiya, directed in-house by Sooraj R. Barjatya, which saved the company from closure. It became one of Indian cinema's biggest grossers, and won six Filmfare Awards including Best Film and the Most Sensational Debut of the Year for 24-year-old Salman Khan.

Salman Khan followed up the success of Maine Pyar Kiya with Rajshri blockbusters Hum Aapke Hain Koun and Hum Saath Saath Hain. Hum Aapke Hain Koun remains one of the highest grossing releases in the history of Indian cinema, and won the National Award for the most popular film providing wholesome entertainment, as well as eight Filmfare Awards and six Screen Awards, including Best Film, Best Actress and Best Director.

Television
Koie Jane Na (2004) - STAR Plus 
Woh Rehne Waali Mehlon Ki (30 May 2005 – 20 January 2011) - Sahara One
Yahaaan Main Ghar Ghar Kheli (17 November 2009 –  13 July 2012) - Zee TV
Pyaar Ke Do Naam: Ek Raadha, Ek Shyaam (2006) - STAR Plus 
Do Hanson Ka Jodaa (2010) - NDTV Imagine
Main Teri Parchhain Hoon (2008–2009) - NDTV Imagine
Jhilmil Sitaaron Ka Aangan Hoga (27 February 2012 – 18 October 2013) - Sahara One
Pyaar Ka Dard Hai Meetha Meetha Pyaara Pyaara (18 June 2012 – 1 November 2014) - STAR Plus
Mere Rang Mein Rangne Waali (17 November 2014 – 10 July 2015) - Life OK
Ek Rishta Saajhedari Ka (8 August 2016 - 31 March 2017) - Sony Entertainment Television
Swabhiman (19 December 2016 -29 September 2017) - Colors TV
Piyaa Albela (6 March 2017 – 24 August 2018) - Zee TV
Dadi Amma... Dadi Amma Maan Jaao! (2020) - Star Plus

Digital
In November 2006, Rajshri Productions launched a broadband entertainment portal, Rajshri.com, offering streaming and downloads of various forms of content including movies, music videos, concerts, and documentaries. The digital content is from its own production house and others.

Offices
Rajshri Productions have offices in various Indian cities such as Mumbai, Rajkot, Hubli, Kolkata, Patna, Cuttack, Siliguri, Kathiar, Bhusawal, Nagpur, Raipur, Indore, Jaipur, Delhi, Kanpur, Allahabad, Varanasi, Gorakhpur, Jalandhar, Vijayawada, Bengaluru, Chennai, Ernakulam and various others.

Awards

Filmography

References

External links
Rajshri's Official website

Rajshri Productions Filmography at Bollywood Hungama

Film distributors of India
Mass media companies established in 1947
Hindi cinema
Film production companies based in Mumbai
Television production companies of India
1947 establishments in India
Producers who won the Best Popular Film Providing Wholesome Entertainment National Film Award